The TrkB internal ribosome entry site (IRES) is an RNA element which is present in the 5' UTR sequence of the mRNA. TrkB is a neurotrophin receptor which is essential for the development and maintenance of the nervous system. The internal ribosome entry site IRES element allows cap-independent translation of TrkB which may be needed for efficient translation in neuronal dendrites.

See also 
Mnt IRES
N-myc IRES
Tobamovirus IRES

References

External links 
 

Cis-regulatory RNA elements